Kirakira Airport  is an airport located at Kirakira on the island of Makira (formerly San Cristobal), part of the Makira-Ulawa Province in the Solomon Islands. It is also known as Ngorangora Airstrip and was constructed in the late 1950s. The airport has scheduled flights provided by Solomon Airlines, using DHC-6 Twin Otter aircraft.

Airlines and destinations

References

Airports in the Solomon Islands